Democrat Ridge is a ridge in Pulaski and Phelps counties in the U.S. state of Missouri. The ridge lies just east of the Big Piney River and Fort Leonard Wood. Missouri Route J traverses the ridge between the cmmunities of Spring Creek and Duke.

Democrat Ridge was named for the fact a large share of the first settlers were Democrats.

References

Landforms of Phelps County, Missouri
Landforms of Pulaski County, Missouri
Ridges of Missouri